The County Championship is the domestic first-class cricket competition in England and Wales.

County Championship may also refer to:

England and Wales
 The County Championship (rugby league), a defunct rugby league competition in England held between 1895 and 1983
 The County Championship (rugby union), an annual rugby union competition in England between teams representing English counties
 The Women's County Championship, a 50-over limited overs cricket competition organised by the England and Wales Cricket Board and the equivalent of the (men's) County Championship

Ireland
 All-Ireland Senior Football Championship, contested by the top inter-county teams
 All-Ireland Senior Hurling Championship, contested by the top inter-county teams